Tehoka Nanticoke is a professional lacrosse player who plays for the Buffalo Bandits of the National Lacrosse League, Chaos Lacrosse Club of the Premier Lacrosse League, and the Iroquois national team. Nanticoke has become popular on the internet due to his trick shots and skill.

Early life
Nanticoke was born on the Six Nations Reservation in Ontario. From an early age, he was taught to play lacrosse by his brother, Chancey Hill, who is 10 years older than him. Hill taught Nanticoke many nontraditional moves and shots that Nanticoke incorporated into his game. Early on, he was scouted and recruited to the IMG Academy in Bradenton, Florida, where he became one of the team's standout players. In 2016 he committed to play for the University at Albany. Nanticoke was considered the number one recruit in 2017 for college lacrosse.

College career
Nanticoke initially did not consider going to college to play lacrosse, but after encouragement from his mother, Catherine, He chose to play at the University of Albany, as he was drawn to the attack minded playing style of coach Scott Marr. Nanticoke finished his first season at Albany with 49 goals and 32 assists in 2018. The following fall semester, Nanticoke did not take part in the lacrosse team, as he was not enrolled in the university. According to head coach Marr, Nanticoke had stayed home due to 'personal reasons', although he added that he expected Nanticoke to rejoin the team for the Spring 2019 season. On March 31, 2021, it was reported that Naticoke was dismissed from the UAlbany men's lacrosse program.

Professional career 
Nanticoke was drafted third overall in the 2021 NLL Draft by the Buffalo Bandits. 

Nanticoke was claimed from the PLL player pool by Chaos on March 5, 2022.

NLL Stats

International career
Nanticoke is a member of the Iroquois Nationals and has represented the under-19 side at the 2016 FIL U-19 World Championship. He is now a part of the 2019 FIL Indoor World Championship team playing for the Iroquois Nationals.

Style of play
Nanticoke is known as an extremely skillful and talented player. He gained popularity online, even in his highschool days for his moves and trick shots. In 2017, he made ESPN's top ten plays for a one handed behind the back and between the legs goals while at IMG Academy. He is also known as an extremely physical player. He weighs more than 200 pounds and is often capable of outmuscling opposing defences.

At times, Nanticoke had been criticized for overly physical play and taking cheap shots at opponents, with his cross-checking penalty in the third period described as one of the turning points in UAlbany's semifinal defeat to Yale in the 2018 NCAA Tournament.

Personal life
He is a member of the Mohawk Nation. He was one of eight Native Americans on the Albany roster for the 2018 season. Nanticoke comes from a deeply political and cultural family with many of his grandparents being faith keepers, or stewards of culture, language, and tradition in Mohawk society. His grandfather took part in the protests at Wounded Knee, South Dakota. His mother spent a year of her childhood summer at the Occupation of Alcatraz. Nanticoke is profoundly influenced by his cultural heritage as he refuses to cut his hair, believes in the spiritual qualities of lacrosse or the "Medicine Game", is a practitioner of the Longhouse Religion, and is fluent in Mohawk.

References 

1998 births
Living people
Iroquois nations lacrosse players
First Nations sportspeople
Lacrosse people from Ontario
Albany Great Danes men's lacrosse players
Canadian Mohawk people
Lacrosse forwards
Six Nations of the Grand River
Competitors at the 2022 World Games